The Brigus Formation is a fossiliferous (e.g. trilobites) upper lower Cambrian geologic formation in Newfoundland and Labrador.

It comprises a series of deep red nodular mudstones, with some prominent grey limestone beds.

See also

 List of fossiliferous stratigraphic units in Newfoundland and Labrador

References
 

Notes

Cambrian Newfoundland and Labrador
Cambrian south paleopolar deposits